Cathaoirleach is the Irish word for chairperson.

In particular it  may refer to:
 Cathaoirleach of Seanad Éireann, the Irish Senate
 In the structure of the Gaelic Athletic Association, the Cathaoirleach of a board, council, or club
 In local government in the Republic of Ireland, the Cathaoirleach or Mayor of a council